Novruzlu is in the Agdam Rayon of Azerbaijan.

References 

Populated places in Aghdam District